Convolvulus oleifolius is a species of plant in the family Convolvulaceae.

Sources

References 

oleifolius
Flora of Malta